Spacetime is a mathematical model in mathematics and physics.

Spacetime, space-time, space time or Space and time may also refer to:

Science and mathematics
 Complex spacetime, a theoretical extension of spacetime into complex-valued space and time coordinates
 Spacetime diagram, a diagram in the theory of relativity
 Space time (chemical engineering), a unit or measure of reaction time
 Space and time in Kant's Critique of Pure Reason

Computing

 SpaceTime (software), 3D search engine software
 Space–time tradeoff, a concept in computing
 Space–time code (STC), a technique in data transmission

Other uses
 Jonah Sharp or Spacetime Continuum, music producer
 "Space Time", a song on The Shamen album Boss Drum
 "Space and Time", a song on The Verve album Urban Hymns
 "Spacetime", a song by Tinashe from Nightride
 SpaceTime, a role-playing game
 "Space" and "Time", two mini-episodes of the TV series Doctor Who
 "Spacetime" (Agents of S.H.I.E.L.D.), a season 3 episode of the TV series
 Space and Time (magazine), a magazine featuring speculative fiction

See also

 Time (disambiguation)
 Space (disambiguation)
 Timespace (disambiguation)